Orhan Eyüpoğlu (1918 – 30 November 1980) was a Turkish politician. A graduate of Istanbul University's Faculty of Law, he was deputy director of the Istanbul Police force. In 1973 he was elected as the secretary general of the Republican People's Party defeating Turan Güneş and Deniz Baykal. He later served as the deputy prime minister in the 40th and 42nd governments. 

Eyüpoğlu died of a heart attack on 30 November 1980.

References

1918 births
1980 deaths
Deputy Prime Ministers of Turkey
Istanbul University Faculty of Law alumni
Republican People's Party (Turkey) politicians
Orhan
Deputies of Istanbul
Members of the 37th government of Turkey
Members of the 40th government of Turkey
Members of the 42nd government of Turkey